Gwiazdy tańczą na lodzie (English: Stars Are Dancing on Ice) is a Polish light entertainment reality television series broadcast by TVP2. It is the Polish version of the ITV's popular Dancing on Ice.

The 1st season of Gwiazdy tańczą na lodzie aired in Poland on TVP2 in the autumn of 2007, the 2nd in the spring of 2008, the 3rd season in the autumn of 2008.

Format
Each week the celebrities and their partners perform a live ice dance routine. The four judges judge each performance and give a mark between 0.0 and 10.0, depending on the performance. These total scores create a leaderboard which combines with the public vote in order to determine the two lowest placed couples. As this is the case, the pair with the lowest score from the judges can avoid being in the bottom two if the public vote for them.

Once the scores and votes are combined to form the final leaderboard for that week's show, the two couples at the bottom compete in a final showdown known as the "Skate Off", where they perform their routine again. Once both couples have performed their routines for the judging panel, the five judges decide on who deserves to stay and cast their votes, based on their second performance. The couple with the most votes from the judges receives a place in the following week's show, while the couple with the fewest votes leaves the competition.

Judges

Seasons

Special 
On December 14, 2007 TVP2 aired a special episode of Gwiazdy tańczą na lodzie – Christmas Dancing on the Ice.

Couples

Perfect 20's (10.0+10.0)

Perfect 30's (10.0+10.0+10.0)

Average Scores of All Couples
Those in bold are couples who won the competition.

See also
Taniec z Gwiazdami

 
Dancing on Ice
Figure skating in Poland
2007 Polish television series debuts
2008 Polish television series endings
Television series by ITV Studios
Polish television series based on British television series
2000s Polish television series
Telewizja Polska original programming